A Time of Destiny is a 1988 American drama war film directed by Gregory Nava and written by Nava and Anna Thomas. The story is based on the opera La forza del destino by Giuseppe Verdi. The motion picture was executive produced by Shep Gordon and Carolyn Pfeiffer. It features original music by veteran composer Ennio Morricone.

Set during World War II in Italy and San Diego, the film tells of two friends who become enemies during the war.

Plot
Soldiers Martin (William Hurt) and Jack (Timothy Hutton) are very good friends during World War II. While their friendship grows, they do not realize they are brothers-in-law. Martin eventually learns that Jack is married to his sister Josie (Melissa Leo).

When Jack and Josie elope, Jorge (Francisco Rabal), her Basque immigrant father, tracks them down and abducts his daughter in order to dominate her with his "old-world" notions of marriage. However, when Jorge Larraneta drowns in a lake after an auto accident, Martin (the black-sheep of the family) returns home and learns of his father's death. He vows revenge after he learns his buddy Jack has become his sworn enemy. Martin gets himself assigned to Jack's infantry platoon in Italy in order to seek vengeance.

Cast
 William Hurt as Martin Larraneta
 Timothy Hutton as Jack
 Melissa Leo as Josie Larraneta
 Francisco Rabal as Jorge Larraneta
 Concha Hidalgo as Sebastiana
 Stockard Channing as Margaret
 Megan Follows as Irene
 Frederick Coffin as Ed
 Peter Palmer as Policeman
 Kelly Pacheco as Young Josie

Distribution
The film was released in a limited basis on April 22, 1988. The box office opening weekend was $509,397 (216 screens).

Box office sales were disappointing. Total sales for the domestic run were $1,212,487 and in its widest release the film was shown in 220 screens. The film closed on June 23, 1988.

Filming locations
Filming locations included: Istria Peninsula, Croatia; País Vasco, Spain; and San Diego, California.

Reception

Critical response
Roger Ebert, film critic for the Chicago Sun-Times, liked the film but questioned the complex screenplay. Yet, Ebert was appreciative of the acting and wrote, "You see what I mean when I call the movie operatic. It glories in brooding vengeance, fatal flaws of character, coincidence and deep morality. Its plot is so labyrinthine that it constitutes the movie's major weakness; can we follow this convoluted emotional journey? Its passions are so large that they are a challenge to actors trained in a realistic tradition, but Hurt, who has the most difficult passages, rises to the occasion with one of the strangest and most effective performances he has given." His television partner Gene Siskel hated the film and put it on his worst of 1988 list.

Vincent Canby was not so kind to the filmmakers or the actors. He wrote in his review for The New York Times, "The movie includes some big, unimpressive battle scenes, a number of orangey sunsets, a lot of comic-strip dialogue ('I'm going to get revenge!' 'He's dead - he'll never forgive me now') and one memorable moment in which the silhouette of a gentle, southern California mountain range fades into the silhouette of a man lying on his death bed. The performances are not good."

The Washington Post was just as tough on Nava and Thomas. Film critic Rita Kempley said, "Hurt's role as a vengeful psycho churns up this laughable purple potboiler, but even the perennial Oscar nominee can't save it from itself."

Soundtrack
An original motion picture soundtrack was released on September 19, 1988, by Virgin Records. The CD, which has eighteen tracks, features original music composed for the film by Ennio Morricone. The recording includes orchestral sounds and several selections of Edda Dell'Orso's vocals. Selections from this soundtrack (mainly the track “Love and Dreams”) were used for the trailer of the film Wyatt Earp.

References

External links
 
 
 
 

1988 films
1980s war drama films
American war drama films
Basque-language films
Columbia Pictures films
Films directed by Gregory Nava
Films scored by Ennio Morricone
Giuseppe Verdi
American World War II films
1988 drama films
1980s English-language films
1980s American films